This is a list of companies located in Massachusetts.

Companies based in Massachusetts

0–9
 2 Minute Medicine

A
 Actifio
 Akamai Technologies
 American Outdoor Brands Corporation
 Analog Devices
 Analysis Group
 Arbella Insurance Group
 athenahealth
 Au Bon Pain
 Avedis Zildjian Company

B
 Bad Martha Brewing Company
 Bain Capital
 Baskin-Robbins
 BBN Technologies
 Berkshire Bank
 Bertucci's
 Big Y
 Biogen
 BJ's Wholesale Club
 Blue Hills Brewery
 Bose Corporation
 Boston Beer Company
 Boston Scientific
 Brine

C
 Cabot Corporation
 Cape Air
 Circle
 Cisco Brewers
 Commerce Bank & Trust Company
 Converse
 CRA International
 Cutter Consortium

D
 Daily Table
 Datawatch Corporation
 Dell EMC
 Destination XL Group
 Dunkin' Brands

E
 Eaton Vance
 Equal Exchange

F
 Fidelity Investments
 Forrester Research
 Friendly's
 Fuze

G
 GE Measurement & Control
 Genzyme
 Gillette
 Global Insight
 Global Partners

H
 Hanover Insurance
 Harpoon Brewery
 Highland Capital Partners
 Hologic
 Homestead Technologies
 Honey Dew Donuts
 Houghton Mifflin Harcourt

I
 Important Records
 iRobot
 Iron Mountain

J
 John Hancock Financial
 Johnny Cupcakes
 Jordan's Furniture

K
 Kadant
 KB Toys
 Kronos Incorporated

L
 L. S. Starrett Company
 Liberty Mutual
 Lionbridge
 Lola.com
 LPL Financial

M
 Market Basket
 Massachusetts Bay Trading Company
 Massachusetts Mutual Life Insurance Company
 MathWorks
 Mercury Brewing Company
 Millennium Pharmaceuticals
 Moderna

N
 Nantucket Airlines
 National Amusements
 Netmorf
 New Balance
 Newburyport Brewing Company
 No Sweat Apparel

O
 Ocean Spray
 OptiRTC

P
 Papa Gino's
 Peter Pan Bus Lines
 Pinsly Railroad Company
 Polar Beverages
 Progress Software

R
 Raytheon
 Reebok
Rocket Software
 Rockport

S
 Salary.com
 Saucony
 Savage Arms
 SharkNinja
 Shaw's and Star Market
 Smith & Wesson
 Spindrift Beverage Co.
 Staples Inc.
 State Street Corporation
 Steinway Musical Instruments
Sterilite
 Stride Rite Corporation

T
 Talbots
 Tea Forté
 Thermo Fisher Scientific
 TJX Companies, owners of HomeGoods, Marshalls and TJ Maxx
 Traveling Vineyard
 Tripadvisor

U
 Unitrends
 Uno Pizzeria & Grill

V
 Vertex Pharmaceuticals
 Vertica

W
 Wachusett Brewing Company
 Welch's

Y
 Yankee Candle
 Yottaa

Z
 Zoom Telephonics

Companies formerly based in Massachusetts

0-9
 3Com

B
 BroadVoice

C
 Cybex International
 CVS Pharmacy

F
 Fidelity Ventures
 Filene's Basement

G
 GreenFuel Technologies Corporation

I
 I-Logix

K
 Kurzweil Educational Systems

L
 Lord & Burnham
 Lotus Software

N
 Necco
 Novell
 NSTAR

P
 Perini Building Company
 Polaroid Corporation

See also 
 List of companies of the United States by state

Lists of companies of the United States by state
 
Companies